The molecular formula  may refer to:

 Nicotelline
 Terpyridine